
Etang de Trente Pas is a small lake and bog below Mont Gond (2709 m), above Conthey, in Valais, Switzerland.

A literal translation of its name is "Pond of 30 steps". The unit of measure "pas" equaled about 60 centimeters.

Trente Pas